Joan Miquel Oliver Ripoll (born 1974 in Sóller, Majorca) is a Majorcan musician who sings and writes songs in the Catalan language. As well as being the songwriter and guitarist of the group Antònia Font, he has also embarked on a solo musical career and has published a novel and a book of poetry.

Discography

With Antònia Font 
 Antònia Font (1999)
 A Rússia (2001)
 Alegria (2002)
 Taxi (2004)
 Batiscafo Katiuscas (2006)
 Coser i Cantar (2007)
 Lamparetes (2011)
 Vostè és aquí (2012)

Solo 
 Droguería Esperança - Odissea 30 000 (2002)
 Joan Miquel Oliver - Surfistes en càmera lenta (2005)
 Joan Miquel Oliver - Live in Paris (2005)
 Joan Miquel Oliver - Sa núvia morta - Hansel i Gretel (single) (2007)
 Soundtrack of My Way (2008)
 Joan Miquel Oliver - Bombón Mallorquín (2009)
 Joan Miquel Oliver - Concert a París (false live with Albert Plà) (2011)
 Joan Miquel Oliver - Pegasus (2015)
 Joan Miquel Oliver - Atlantis (2017)
  Joan Miquel Oliver - Elektra (2018)

Literary works 
 Odissea trenta mil (poems), Palma de Mallorca, Lleonard Muntaner Editor, 2002.
 El misteri de l'amor (novel), Barcelona, Empúries, 2008.
 Un quilo d'invisible (theatre), Barcelona, Narrativa 433, Empúries, 2013.
 ''Setembre, octubre i novembre" (novel), Barcelona, L'Altra Editorial, 2014.

External links 
 Joan Miquel Oliver on MySpace
  Majorcan Chronicles
  Photo gallery
  Selected poems from Odissea trenta mil
  Interview with Joan Miquel Oliver on WAAAU.TV
  Joan Miquel Oliver plays Final feliç on the acoustic guitar on WAAAU.TV

Spanish singer-songwriters
Spanish guitarists
Spanish male guitarists
Catalan-language singers
People from Sóller
1974 births
Living people
Singers from the Balearic Islands
Date of birth missing (living people)
21st-century Spanish singers
21st-century guitarists
21st-century Spanish male singers
Sony Music Spain artists
Música Global artists